Otter Creek may refer to some places in the North America:

Bodies of water
 Otter Creek (British Columbia), a river in British Columbia
 Otter Creek (Delaware River), a tributary of the Delaware River, also known as Mill Creek
 Otter Creek (Ocmulgee River tributary), a stream in Georgia that connects to the Ocmulgee River
 Otter Creek (Seventeen Mile Creek tributary), a stream in Georgia
 Otter Creek (Wabash River), a stream in Indiana
 Otter Creek (Iowa River tributary), a river in Iowa
 Otter Creek (Pechman Creek tributary), a river in Iowa
 Otter Creek (Saint Louis River), a stream in Minnesota
 Otter Creek (Lamine River), a river in Missouri
 Otter Creek (North Fork Salt River), a river in Missouri
 Otter Creek (St. Francis River), a stream in Missouri
 Otter Creek (Niobrara River tributary), a stream in Holt and Rock Counties, Nebraska
 Otter Creek (Black River tributary), a stream in New York
 Otter Creek (Tennessee), a tributary of the Little Harpeth River
 Otter Creek (Vermont), a tributary of Lake Champlain
 Otter Creek (Wisconsin), a stream in Sauk County
 Otter Creek (Lake Erie), a watershed administered by the Long Point Region Conservation Authority, that drains into Lake Erie 
 Otter Creek (Wyoming) , is a stream in Wyoming and has an elevation of 6,342 feet. Otter Creek is situated south of Spring Creek, and southwest of Lone Bear Ditch Number 2.

Cities and towns
 Otter Creek, Florida, a town
 Otter Creek, Georgia, an unincorporated community
 Otter Creek, Iowa, an unincorporated community
 Otter Creek, Kentucky, an unincorporated community
 Otter Creek, Minnesota, an unincorporated community near Cloquet, Minnesota
 Otter Creek, Dunn County, Wisconsin, a town
 Otter Creek, Eau Claire County, Wisconsin, a town

Other uses
 Otter Creek Outdoor Recreation Area, near Louisville, Kentucky
 Otter Creek Wilderness, a wilderness area in West Virginia
 Otter Creek Brewing, a brewery in Middlebury, Vermont

See also
 Otter Creek, Ontario (disambiguation)
 Otter Creek Township (disambiguation)
 Otter Creek, Wisconsin (disambiguation)